Audiobrain is a sonic branding firm based in New York City.

History
Audiobrain was founded in 2003. 

Audrey Arbeeny, Audiobrain's Owner, Founder and Executive Producer, currently teaches Sonic Branding at New York's Pratt Institute.

Projects
Notable projects of Audiobrain's include the sonic branding for Microsoft's Xbox 360 (including the sound logo and user interface sounds), sonic branding for author David Meerman Scott’s World Wide Rave, Virgin Mobile USA’s product sonification, and Major League Soccer's Official Anthem.

Audiobrain also serves as Music Supervisors for NBC Sports and Olympics, and received an Emmy Award for their work on the NBC Beijing Olympics Broadcast.

References

External links 
 Audiobrain home page
 Audiobrain YouTube page

Audio branding